Moores Fork is an unincorporated community in Clermont County, in the U.S. state of Ohio.

History
A post office called Moores Fork was established in 1884, and remained in operation until 1906. The community takes its name from nearby Moores Fork creek.

References

Unincorporated communities in Clermont County, Ohio
Unincorporated communities in Ohio